Alfred Ernst (21 February 1875, Winterthur – 17 September 1968, Zürich) was a Swiss botanist.

He attended classes at the teachers' seminar in Küsnacht, followed by studies of biological sciences in Paris. From 1897 to 1899 he worked as a teacher in Naples. Afterwards, he received his doctorate in sciences from the University of Zürich, where in 1905, he became an associate professor. From 1909 to 1945 he was a professor of general botany at Zürich, being chosen university rector in 1928.

His primary research dealt with the propagation of algae, the embryology of flowering plants and heterostyly in Primula species. In 1905/06 and 1930/31 he was involved in botanical investigations in Java.

Selected works 
 Bastardierung als Ursache der Apogamie im Pflanzenreich, 1918 – Hybridization as the cause of apogamy in the plant kingdom.

 Genetische Studien über Heterostylie bei Primula, 1925 – Genetic studies of heterostyly in Primula.
 Weitere Studien über die Vererbung der Calcycanthemie bei Primula, 1931 – Further studies on inheritance of calycanthema with Primula. 
 Die Nachkommenschaften aus Kreuzungen zwischen dimorphen und monomorphen Primula-Arten der Sektion Candelabra, 1943 – The progeny from crosses between dimorphic and monomorphic Primula species of the section Candelabra.

References 

1875 births
1968 deaths
People from Winterthur
Academic staff of the University of Zurich
20th-century Swiss botanists
Phycologists